Nizhnyaya Mayka (Tübänge Mayqı) is a rural locality (a village) in Mrakovsky Selsoviet, Kugarchinsky District, Bashkortostan, Russia. The population was 2 as of 2010. There is 1 street.

Geography 
Nizhnyaya Mayka is located 8 km south of Mrakovo (the district's administrative centre) by road. Mrakovo is the nearest rural locality.

References 

Rural localities in Kugarchinsky District